Guatapé is a town and municipality in the Department of Antioquia, Colombia. Guatapé is bordered on the north by Alejandría, San Rafael to the east, and Granada and El Peñol to the south. This town is the gathering place for Las Vegas, referring to the small farms of the area.

The town is a major tourist attraction, especially for travelers from Medellín. El Peñón de Guatapé, a large rock that visitors can climb, and the famous zócalos (murals) that adorn several buildings attract many tourists.

History
Before Iberian conquistadors reached the area in the 16th century, this territory was inhabited by indigenous groups, some controlled by a cacique named Guatape. In his honor, the town was named after him. The name "Guatapé", comes from the Quechua language, related to "stones and water". Another name that the town had in the past was "La Ceja de Guatapé".

In 1714, the indigenous people under Guatapé of this region were grouped into a shelter known as "San Antonio de Remolinos Peñol". Traces of their existence come from clay urns found in the town of Alto Verde, and several archaeological sites not yet studied in the villages of La Peña, La Piedra, El Roble, and El Rosario.

Guatapé was founded on 4 October 1811, by the Spaniard Don Francisco Giraldo y Jimenez. It was declared a municipality in September 1867.

Guatapé has changed throughout its history. It was predominantly a farming town that relied on livestock, agriculture, and mining. Empresas Públicas de Medellín built a large hydroelectric complex here in the 1970s. This megaproject produced large impacts on social, economic, political, environmental, and cultural development in the locality. With the construction of this dam, Guatapé became one of the most important electric production centers in the country.

Demographics
Total Population: 6,469 inhabitants (2015)
 Urban population: 5,045
 Rural population: 1,424

Literacy: 92.3% (2005)

Ethnicity:
According to figures presented by DANE census in 2005, the ethnic makeup of the township is the following:
 Mestizo & White (99.96%)
 Afro-Colombian (0.04 %)

Sites of interest

 Calle del Recuerdo ("Memory Lane")
 Parish Church of Nuestra Señora del Carmen
 Chapel of Our Lady of Santa Ana
 Community Historical Museum.
 Pueblo de Zócalos
 Waterfalls

La Piedra

El Peñón de Guatapé is a rock formation that borders a lake. It formed along the Antioquia Rock Base (batolito de antioquia), 70 million years ago. With two-thirds of its height below ground, the exposed vertical face is over 200 meters high and visible from throughout the surrounding countryside.  Visitors can scale the rock via a staircase built into one side, a path that includes more than 649 steps to the top.  On the flat top of the rock, food vendors offer outdoor tables overlooking vistas that stretch to the horizon in every direction. Above the food vendors are two gift shops, and an open-air viewing area to see the spectacular scenery.

Also, you can visit two monasteries, that belong to the "Benedictinos" Communities. The monks are devoted to receiving and sharing with visitors.

There are many Ferries available, to take tours around the dam, and to visit islands known as "The Fantasy Island Hotel", located at 3 NM, north of Guatapé shore. There are also many extreme and traditional water sports available.

, there were plans to construct an airport for ultralight aviation.

Zócalos
Each building has tiles along the facade's lower walls in bright colors and dimensioned images. Many of the tiles are tied to the products sold by the shops, or the beliefs of the residents. Others are cultural images of the farming heritage of the community.

Gallery

References

External links

Corporacion CIMTED, Desarrollo desde lo local, Entrepreneur projects in the Guatape City
ON-LINE RADIO STATION - LIVE GUATAPE VIDEO

Municipalities of Antioquia Department
Populated places established in 1811